12ft.io is a website that allows online paywalls to be bypassed. It was created by Thomas Millar and Seron. The name is based on the phrase "show me a 10 foot wall and I'll show you a 12 foot ladder." It bypasses paywalls by pretending to be a search engine crawler when requesting a webpage. Websites with paywalls often allow access to search engine crawlers to ensure their pages appear in search engines. Still, some websites block 12ft, such as Bloomberg.

Outage history 
On 31 August 2022, the site was offline, with the hosting provider displaying the error message of "DEPLOYMENT DISABLED," and the HTTP 451 status code, meaning "Unavailable For Legal Reasons." The site came back online on 1 September, but was disabled again on 10 September. The site was available again as of 11 September, but was no longer showing cached versions of pages for NYTimes.com; instead displaying a message of "12ft has been disabled for this site".

On 7 February 2023, the site went offline with the error message "DEPLOYMENT DISABLED," and the HTTP 451 status code. Within the same day, the site came back online again.

References

External links 
 Official website

Websites
Open access projects